Tulliby Lake is a hamlet in central Alberta, Canada within the County of Vermilion River.

Climate

Demographics 
The population of Tulliby Lake according to the 2015 municipal census conducted by the County of Vermilion River is 22.

Amenities 
Tulliby Lake has a Petro-Canada cardlock fuel station, a community centre, a natural-ice skating rink, and an open-air riding arena.

See also 
List of communities in Alberta
List of hamlets in Alberta

References 

Hamlets in Alberta
County of Vermilion River